James L. Dennison (born February 5, 1938) is a former American football and baseball coach, player, and college athletics administrator.  On November 11, 2012, Dennison retired as the head football coach at Walsh University in North Canton, Ohio.  He had held that position since February 11, 1994, the year before the school's football team began play in 1995.  From 1973 to 1985, Dennison was the head football coach at the University of Akron.  He was also the head baseball coach at Akron in 1966.  Dennison served as the athletic director at Akron (1986–1993) and Walsh (1993–2007).  He played college football and college baseball at the College of Wooster, from which he graduated in 1960.

Head coaching record

College football

References

1938 births
Living people
Akron Zips athletic directors
Akron Zips baseball coaches
Akron Zips football coaches
Walsh Cavaliers football coaches
Wooster Fighting Scots baseball players
Wooster Fighting Scots football players
High school football coaches in Ohio
People from Medina County, Ohio
Players of American football from Ohio